Spectracanthicus immaculatus is a species of catfish in the family Loricariidae. It is native to South America, where it occurs in the Tapajós basin in Brazil. The species reaches 8.2 cm (3.2 inches) SL. Its specific epithet, immaculatus, is derived from a Latin word translating to "spotless", referring to the species' lack of any form of spotted patterning.

S. immaculatus appears in the aquarium trade, where it is sometimes referred to either as the non-spot rodent pleco or by its associated L-number, which is L-269.

References 

Fish described in 2014
Freshwater fish of Brazil
Loricariidae